Francis O'Neill (1886–1960) was an American Hall of Fame jockey who won top stakes races in the United States but whose career was cut short by the catastrophic impact of the Hart–Agnew Law anti-betting legislation. He had no choice but to find work in Europe and in 1908, he and trainer Fred Burlew went to race in Europe from a base in France where they had much success. O'Neill won three British and four French Classic Races and was the annual Champion Rider in France eleven times in fourteen years.
 Among notable owners, O'Neill rode for the American William Kissam Vanderbilt and French owner Baron Edouard A. de Rothschild.

References

1886 births
1960 deaths
American jockeys
British jockeys
French jockeys
United States Thoroughbred Racing Hall of Fame inductees
People from Harvey County, Kansas